The Vallière is a  long river in the Jura and Saône-et-Loire departments in eastern France. Its source is in the steephead valley of Revigny, in the Jura Mountains. It flows generally west. It is a right tributary of the Solnan, into which it flows between Bruailles and Louhans.

Departments and communes along its course
This list is ordered from source to mouth: 
 Jura: Revigny, Conliège, Montaigu, Perrigny, Lons-le-Saunier, Montmorot, Courlans, Courlaoux, Condamine, 
 Saône-et-Loire: Savigny-en-Revermont, Flacey-en-Bresse, Sagy, Saint-Martin-du-Mont, Bruailles, Louhans,

References

Rivers of France
Rivers of Bourgogne-Franche-Comté
Rivers of Jura (department)
Rivers of Saône-et-Loire